West Ocean City is a census-designated place (CDP) in Worcester County, Maryland, United States. The population was 4,375 at the 2010 census. It is part of the Salisbury, Maryland-Delaware Metropolitan Statistical Area.

Geography
West Ocean City is located at  (38.335010, −75.112474). It is located across the Sinepuxent Bay from Ocean City.

Climate
The climate in this area is characterized by hot, humid summers and generally mild to cool winters.  According to the Köppen Climate Classification system, West Ocean City has a humid subtropical climate, abbreviated "Cfa" on climate maps.

Demographics

As of the census of 2000, there were 3,311 people, 1,425 households, and 967 families residing in the CDP. The racial makeup of the CDP was 96.04% White, 1.60% African American, 0.42% Native American, 0.66% Asian, 0.03% Pacific Islander, 0.06% from other races, and 1.18% from two or more races. Hispanic or Latino of any race were 1.42% of the population.

There were 1,425 households, out of which 23.7% had children under the age of 18 living with them, 57.1% were married couples living together, 8.4% had a female householder with no husband present, and 32.1% were non-families. 25.1% of all households were made up of individuals, and 8.6% had someone living alone who was 65 years of age or older. The average household size was 2.32 and the average family size was 2.77.

In the CDP, the population was spread out, with 19.8% under the age of 18, 5.0% from 18 to 24, 27.9% from 25 to 44, 28.3% from 45 to 64, and 19.1% who were 65 years of age or older. The median age was 44 years. For every 100 females, there were 97.2 males. For every 100 females age 18 and over, there were 95.0 males.

The median income for a household in the CDP was $42,279, and the median income for a family was $51,111. Males had a median income of $30,444 versus $27,222 for females. The per capita income for the CDP was $28,132. About 3.0% of families and 5.0% of the population were below the poverty line, including 4.1% of those under age 18 and 3.1% of those age 65 or over.

Tourism
West Ocean City is located along U.S. Route 50 across the Harry W. Kelley Memorial Bridge over the Sinepuxent Bay from the beach resort town of Ocean City. The area is home to fishing charters, boating, marinas, and the Outlets Ocean City.

References

External links
 West Ocean City Association

 
Census-designated places in Worcester County, Maryland
Census-designated places in Maryland
Salisbury metropolitan area
Populated coastal places in Maryland